The Open Media Foundation (OMF) is an American, non-profit, charitable, multimedia organization that provides the means necessary for people to create, edit, and share their visions across various media platforms. OMF's main goal is to put the power of media into the hands of community members who otherwise would not have the fiscal means of doing so.  They provide communications services to nonprofit and public sector organizations (primarily web and video production), training in media and technology, and access to media tools and resources, primarily through Denver Open Media.

In December, 2018, the city of Denver revoked the public access contract from OMF, despite significant and months long public outcry  from community members to keep the contract with OMF. As of 2019, OMF's community media arm, Denver Open Media, operates an FM Radio station on 92.9FM and 89.3HD3 and on-line video outlet/stream at denveropenmedia.org.

About The Open Media Foundation

OMF's mission statement: to put the power of media and technology into the hands of the people in order to enable every person to actively engage their community and bring about the change they wish to see in the world.

Open Media Foundation attempts to divert some of the power away from larger media conglomerates into the hands of the people. Many people do not have access or the necessary funding to get their voices heard by the masses. OMF wants to change this by providing equipment, space, and the knowledge necessary to create what the producers desire.

OMF is based in Denver, Colorado's "Santa Fe Arts District" where it manages a 20,000 SqFt building that houses its 2 Radio studios, classrooms, and Audio/Video production facilities. The Open Media Foundation building is also home to a number of smaller, independent nonprofit media entities including The Colorado Independent online news agency, KGNU AM & FM community radio, Just Media (academy-award-nominated nonprofit film production company), The Denver Voice newspaper distributed by the homeless, and DenHac, a hackers collective which launched Denver Open Media's FM Radio station together with OMF in 2016. The radio station, which launched as part of Denver Open Media plays local content exclusively, primarily focused on music from the larger Denver-Metro Region scene. Programming for the radio station is automated based on community votes on the DOM website.

History of Open Media Foundation
2001: Tony Shawcross, Executive Director of the Open Media Foundation, co-founded a non-commercial website called [denverevolution] in order to promote independent arts and non-commercial community events overlooked by the local media.

2003: members of the denverevolution collective began producing video as the [denverevolution] production group, borrowing gear from friends at KBDI (PBS 12), Free Speech TV, and Denver Community Television. FSTV provided them with their first editing station in an office donated by Little Voice Productions'.

2004: OMF expanded its media and technology training services with a new office connected to Denver's PS1 Charter School, formed a board, and was granted 501(C)(3) tax-exempt status, incorporating as "the [denverevolution] production group."

2005: OMF changed its name to Deproduction and with the closure of Denver Community Television, submitted a proposal to re-launch Public-access television in Denver under an entirely new model, leveraging emerging web 2.0 technologies and business models into community media.

2006: OMF launched Denver Open Media (DOM), with an independent brand and name that could be owned by the community.

2007" OMF (then Deproduction) was selected to manage production and launch the State-Wide Colorado Channel, which launched in January, 2008.

2008: after winning a Knight News Challenge award, OMF (then Deproduction) merged with Civic Pixel, a Denver-based web development firm who had built the DOM website.

2009: the parent organization changed its name to the Open Media Foundation, dropping the Deproduction and Civic Pixel names. Denver Open Media remained an independent, community-run project of the parent company, Open Media Foundation.

2010: OMF launched the Open Media Project, the result of their two-year Knight News Challenge Grant.  The Open Source Software was beta-tested in 6 other cities, in an effort to build a nationwide network of Public Access TV stations collaborating on web-based community media tools and sharing content. 

2012: OMF launched an open-source software-as-a-service for The Colorado State House of Representatives and Colorado State Senate at (http://coloradochannel.net). 

2016: OMF launched Denver Open Media Radio, Denver's first radio station devoted entirely to local content.

2017: OMF launched Open.Media, a national software service for streaming and archiving videos of state and local governments based on the software originally built for the Colorado State House of Representatives. The software is provided free of charge to small, rural governments, with dozens of medium and large government bodies paying for the service.

December, 2018: the city of Denver revoked the public access contract from OMF, despite significant and months long public outcry  from community members to keep the contract with OMF, the City of Denver began running Public Access TV internally with City Staff & contractors.

June, 2019: Denver Open Media changed from its original 104.7 Low-Power FM station to 92.9FM and 89.3HD3, significantly expanding the reach of their FM broadcast.

Dec 2020: Open Media moved from 700 Kalamath to 2101 Arapahoe St. together with KGNU, KUVO, and over a dozen other community media organizations

References

External links

 Denver Open Media

Non-profit technology
Free software project foundations in the United States